Sri Srimati Satyabhama is a 2000 Telugu-language romance film directed by S. V. Krishna Reddy starring Rehman and Vijayashanti. Reddy also wrote the screenplay and composed the music.

Cast
 Rehman
 Vijayashanti

Plot

A rich businessman transfers his wealth to his brother-in-law's son, believing that the son and his adored daughter will soon be married. But after he dies of a heart attack, the brother-in-law evicts the businessman's widow and daughter from the house and sends his son to America. Fifteen years later, the son returns, still in love with the daughter, and despairing of his father allowing them to marry, poisons her and himself. Miraculously, he survives. She supposedly dies, but on a trip to New Zealand he meets and falls in love with a woman named Dolly, who strongly resembles her. He brings Dolly back to India, where she tells his father that she is in fact his niece in disguise, and makes his life miserable in various ways.

Soundtrack

References

External links
 

2000 films
Indian romance films
Films directed by S. V. Krishna Reddy
Films scored by S. V. Krishna Reddy
2000s Telugu-language films